The Papua New Guinea national futsal team is controlled by the Papua New Guinea Football Association, the governing body for futsal in Papua New Guinea and represents the country in international futsal competitions, such as the World Cup and the Oceanian Futsal Championship.

Tournament records

FIFA Futsal World Cup

Oceanian Futsal Championship record

References

External links
 Papua New Guinea Football Association

Papua New Guinea
National sports teams of Papua New Guinea
Futsal in Papua New Guinea